John Leslie Cornell Jr. (born June 4, 1989) is a former American football offensive guard in the National Football League (NFL). Cornell originally signed with the Baltimore Ravens as an undrafted free agent in 2012. Cornell played college football at Illinois. Cornell is currently head coach of the Quincy Notre Dame Raiders.

In high school, Cornell was ranked the 12th prospect in the state of Illinois by Rivals.com and was nationally ranked as the 37th prospect at the offensive tackle position. He was a 2006 Max-Enfinger All-American while at Notre Dame High School. He participated in the 2007 Illinois Shrine Bowl.

Early years 

Cornell attended Notre Dame High School at Quincy, Illinois, in which he earned three letters for football and four letters for wrestling. Cornell was a 2006 Max-Enfinger All-American at high school. Cornell was a two-time Chicago Tribune All-state as both Junior and Senior.

College career 

Cornell played college football at the University of Illinois. Cornell played 29 games at offensive guard for the Illinois Fighting Illini.

In his redshirt freshman year, he played in two games.

In his sophomore year, he played one game for the season.

In his junior year, he played 13 games and started 6 of them at guard and at tackle. He helped the Fighting Illini offense lead the Big Ten in rushing and the 11th ranked rushing team in the nation with an average of 246.1 ypg. On November 20, 2010, he helped the Illinois Fighting Illini offense record a total of 559 yards, including 519 rushing yards against Northwestern in which Illinois won the game 41-20.

In his senior year, he was named a senior team captain for the season. Cornell was a recipient of Illinois Fighting Illini's Red Orange Award. He played and started 13 games at offensive guard for the season. On October 8, 2011, he helped the Fighting Illini offense to record 518 total yards including 308 rushing yards against Indiana in which Illinois wins the game 41-20. On September 24, 2011, he helped anchored the Illinois Fighting Illini offense record a total of 463 yards against Western Michigan.

Professional career

Baltimore Ravens 

On April 28, 2012, he signed with the Baltimore Ravens as an undrafted free agent. On August 31, 2012, he was released on the day of roster cuts.  On September 1, 2012, he was re-signed to join the practice squad. On August 25, 2013, he was waived by the Ravens.

Oakland Raiders 
The Raiders signed Cornell to their practice squad on September 11, 2013 and promoted him to their active roster on October 5 and was waived 2 days later on October 7, 2013 and re-signed to the practice squad on Oct. 9. On October 26, Cornell was promoted again to the active roster and was waived once more 2 days later on October 28, 2013. He was re-signed to the practice squad on October 30, 2013. On November 9, 2013 Cornell was signed again and was waived two days later on November 11, 2013. Once again he was re-signed to the practice squad on November 13, 2013.

Coaching career

Culver-Stockton College 
Cornell began his college coaching career in 2017 as the offensive line coach for Culver-Stockton College in Canton, Missouri.

Following his career at Culver-Stockton, he accepted a position at his high school alma mater Quincy Notre Dame as the head football coach.

References

External links 
 Illinois Fighting Illini bio
 Baltimore Ravens bio
 Culver-Stockton College bio

1989 births
Living people
Sportspeople from Quincy, Illinois
American football offensive guards
Illinois Fighting Illini football players
Baltimore Ravens players
Oakland Raiders players
Players of American football from Illinois